LuvBug is an English electronic dance music trio consisting of London-born DJ & producer Marvin Humes, Manchester-based producer White N3rd and producer/songwriter JKAY.

Career
Humes and JKAY grew up in Woolwich, East London with JKAY becoming part of the songwriting/producing duo Tracklacers. They worked with producers including Danja (Justin Timberlake, Usher) and Afrojack (David Guetta, Major Lazer) and also produced early material for JLS, the pop/R&B boy band Humes was formerly a part of. N3rd has produced remixes for Diplo and Azealia Banks and was introduced to Humes through songwriter Ali Tennant (Guetta). In April 2013, the trio came together at a London-based studio and started working on material. The group released a string of remixes for the likes of Leah McFall & will.i.am, Inner City, Case & Foxy Brown.

2014–present: Single releases
After signing to Polydor Records and working with producer Pantha, Humes suggested British R&B singer Talay Riley for vocals and thus created their debut single "Resonance", which was released on 5 October 2014 and debuted at number 13 on the UK Singles Chart and number 10 on the Scottish charts. An album was announced to be in the works.

Its second single, "Revive (Say Something)", featuring uncredited vocals from Mark Asari, was released on 15 February 2015, and peaked at number 17 on the UK Singles Chart.

The third single, "Best Is Yet to Come", featuring uncredited vocals from Scouting for Girls, was released on 15 April 2016. The audio video was released in February 2016 on YouTube and Vevo. Claudia Gadelha used Best is Yet to Come as her walkout song at UFC 212.

Discography

Singles

Remixes

References

English electronic music groups
English dance music groups